Plíšek (Czech pronunciation: [pliːʃek], feminine: Plíšková) is a Czech surname. Notable people include:

 Jiří Plíšek (born 1972), Czech football player and manager
 Karolína Plíšková (born 1992), Czech tennis player
 Kristýna Plíšková (born 1992), Czech tennis player, identical twin sister of Karolína
 Naděžda Plíšková, Czech graphic artist
 Tereza Plíšková (born 1990), Czech curling competitor

See also
 
Pliskov (disambiguation)

Czech-language surnames